Mike Hedges (born 1954) is a British audio producer/engineer best known for his work with The Cure, Siouxsie and the Banshees, and Manic Street Preachers. During his career, Hedges has worked with an eclectic roster of artists ranging from rock and pop acts such as U2, Dido, Travis, Texas, The Beautiful South, and Everything but the Girl, to cult-indie band The Cooper Temple Clause and classically oriented projects, The Priests and Sarah Brightman. His creative input and influence dramatically impacted the trajectories of bands such as the Cure, The Associates, Manic Street Preachers, and Travis.

Young life
Hedges was born in Nottingham, England in 1953 and grew up in Zambia (specifically Northern Rhodesia), where he attended a Jesuit school. He comes from a Catholic family.

Career
Hedges returned to the UK in 1969 and was working in Haywards Heath as a squash coach when he was offered a job as a tape op at London's Morgan Studios. His first engineer credit came in the form of Heatwave's Central Heating. In 1981, he left Morgan Studios to become a freelancer and start Playground Studios in Camden Town, then moved on to work at Abbey Road Studios for ten years. Siouxsie and the Banshees, the Associates, and Wah! were among some of his earliest clients. Hedges lived in the Willesden area of London near Morgan Studios.

In 1990, he purchased Chateau de la Rouge Motte, a home in Domfront en Poiraie in the Normandy countryside, and retired for less than a month in 1992. He renovated the chateau to act as a new studio and outfitted it with a 16 channel EMI TG12345 Mark IV mixing desk, which he bought directly from Abbey Road Studios in 1983. The desk was originally installed in Abbey Road Studios, and had been used to record The Dark Side of the Moon by Pink Floyd and John Lennon's single "Imagine." Among the albums recorded there were Lush's Split, Manic Street Preachers' Everything Must Go (BRIT Award recipient) and This Is My Truth Tell Me Yours, and Travis' The Man Who(partially). James Dean Bradfield of the Manic Street Preachers recalled that Hedges greeted them with a hand covered in Normandy brandy and lit on fire, which is how Hedges claimed to welcome every new band.

There were four floors in the chateau: Hedges and his family lived on the top floor; the ten bedrooms on the first floor are for visiting musicians; and the ground floor and basement are control rooms and recording studios. Hedges moved the Mark IV desk back to London in the early 2000s, where it resided in the front room of a studio, and in 2017 was auctioned off for £1.4 million. 

Hedges has also worked as part of the musical team for a number of films including Harry Potter and the Goblet of Fire and The Doom Generation.

In 2009, he was working in an A&R role at Sony BMG, where he signed The Priests. He also discovered Friar Alessandro in Italy in 2012.

Personal life
He has 4 sons, Michael, Ethan, Aengus and James

Selected discography

References

External links
[ Allmusic.com discography]

British record producers
British audio engineers
Living people
 1953 births
People from Nottingham
White Zambian people